Sepala William Daineris Rathnayke (5 December 1901 - 26 January 1986) was a Sri Lankan politician.

Ratnayke was elected to the Parliament of Ceylon at the 3rd parliamentary election in 1956, representing the Deniyaya electorate, defeating the sitting member, V. G. W. Ratnayake, by 5,460 votes.

References 

1901 births
1986 deaths
Sri Lanka Freedom Party politicians
Members of the 3rd Parliament of Ceylon